Lagumot Gagiemem Nimidere Harris (23 December 1938 – 8 September 1999) was a political figure from the Pacific nation of the Republic of Nauru, and served as its President. He was a cousin of René Harris.

First term as President of Nauru
Lagumot Harris first served briefly as President of Nauru from 19 April to 15 May 1978. Thus, he was Nauru's third head of state since its independence in 1968. In terms of Nauru's emerging post-Independence political culture, the shortness of Harris's first term of Presidential office anticipated the very frequent changes of President to which Nauruans were to become accustomed, in contrast with the many years of Hammer DeRoburt's continuous first term of office.

Second term as President of Nauru
Subsequently, a period of nearly twenty years elapsed before Harris assumed the Presidency of Nauru for a second term.

He was elected President of Nauru again, and served between 22 November 1995 and 11 November 1996.

Harris was Minister of Finance in the cabinet of Ruben Kun from December 1996 to February 1997.

Issues and alignment
Much of Lagumot Harris's active involvement in political leadership revolved around troubled issues surrounding the veteran Nauruan politician, seven-time President Bernard Dowiyogo. It may be recalled that, especially during Harris' periods of public office and political activity, Nauru's Parliamentary system did not have well-developed party organisations.

Death
Harris died in Melbourne, Australia, on 8 September 1999 at the age of 60.

References

See also
 Politics of Nauru

1938 births
1999 deaths
Members of the Parliament of Nauru
Presidents of Nauru
Finance Ministers of Nauru
20th-century Nauruan politicians